Pitfall! is a platform video game designed by David Crane for the Atari 2600 and released by Activision in 1982. The player controls Pitfall Harry and is tasked with collecting all the treasures in a jungle within 20 minutes. The world consists of 255 screens which are horizontally connected in a flip screen manner. Each screen has one or more hazards: quicksand, tarpits, rolling logs, crocodiles, snakes, scorpions, campfires, and swinging vines.

Pitfall! received positive reviews upon release and is now considered one of the greatest video games ever made. It is one of the best-selling games on the Atari 2600, with over four million copies sold. It was the top video game on the Billboard charts for more than a year, and it helped define the flip-screen platform game genre. Across all versions, the game sold over  copies worldwide.

The game was followed by several sequels, beginning with Pitfall II: Lost Caverns, which was also developed by Crane; it was released for the Atari 2600 in 1984.

Gameplay

The player controls Pitfall Harry through 255 horizontally connected screens of jungle in an attempt to recover 32 treasures in a 20-minute time period. Along the way, players must maneuver around pits, quicksand, rolling logs, fire, rattlesnakes, scorpions, and crocodiles. Harry may jump over or otherwise avoid these obstacles by climbing, running, or swinging on vines.

Treasure consists of bags of money, gold and silver bars, and diamond rings, which range in value from 2,000 to 5,000 points. There are eight of each treasure type. The player begins the game with three lives and a score of 2,000 points; a perfect score of 114,000 is achieved by collecting all 32 treasures without losing any points by falling into holes or touching logs.

Running under every screen is an underground tunnel, which Harry can access by climbing down ladders or falling into holes. Traveling through the tunnel moves Harry forward three screens at a time, which is necessary to collect the treasures within the time limit. However, the tunnels can be blocked by brick walls, forcing the player to return to the surface to find a way around. The tunnels also contain scorpions. The player loses a life if Harry comes in contact with any obstacle (except logs) or falls into a tar pit, quicksand, waterhole, or mouth of a crocodile. The game ends when either all 32 treasures have been collected, all three lives have been lost, or the time has run out.

Development and release
Pitfall! was created by David Crane, a programmer who worked for Activision in the early 1980s. In a November 2003 interview with Edge, he described how in 1979 he had developed a technique to display a realistic running man and in 1982 was searching for a suitable game in which to use it:

The game uses non-flickering, multicolored, animated sprites on a system with notoriously primitive graphics hardware. To fit the game on a 4096 byte ROM, a polynomial counter generates the 255 screens within 50 bytes of code. The swinging vines are created by repeatedly displaying a one pixel wide sprite at different offsets.

Pitfall! was released on August 20, 1982. When the game was originally sold, anyone who scored above 20,000 points could send Activision a picture of their television screen to receive a Pitfall Harry Explorer Club patch. The television commercial for Pitfall! featured then-child actor Jack Black at age 13 in his first TV role.

Reception

Pitfall! for the Atari 2600 was the best-selling home video game from late 1982 to the first quarter of 1983. By mid-January 1983, it had been the top-selling game on the Billboard chart for seven weeks—much more successful than E.T., which Atari had paid $21 million to license—and remained in the number one position for 64 weeks in a row. The game sold  units in five months, and went on to sell over  units by 1984. It is one of the best-selling games on the Atari 2600, with over four million copies sold . All versions of the game sold over  copies worldwide, .

Danny Goodman of Creative Computing Video & Arcade Games stated that Pitfall! was "a standout" among the dozens of 2600 games announced at the summer 1982 Consumer Electronics Show, a "very original cartridge no VCS should be without". Arcade Express reviewed the Atari 2600 version of Pitfall! in August 1982, stating that it "may well be the best adventure game yet produced for the VCS" and giving it a score of 8 out of 10. Electronic Games in June 1983 praised the 2600 version's "superb graphics and varied play-action".

Goodman was surprised that the Intellivision version's graphics had not greatly improved on the 2600's. Video Games in March 1983 criticized Activision for not enhancing the Intellivision version's graphics: "We all know you can do more with graphics on Intellivision than on the VCS. So why no improvements in Pitfall?"

The 2600 version of Pitfall! was awarded "Best Adventure Video Game" at the 4th annual Arkie Awards. In 1995, Flux magazine ranked the game 33rd on their "Top 100 Video Games." Game Informer placed the game 41st on their top 100 video games of all time in 2001. In 2004, Pitfall! was inducted into GameSpot's list of the greatest games of all time. In 2013 Entertainment Weekly listed it as one of the ten best Atari 2600 games.

Legacy
Pitfall! is considered one of the most influential games for the Atari 2600 system. It is a prototypical side-scrolling platform game, a genre which would dominate future 8-bit and 16-bit systems, and introduced features that would be common in future platform games, such as the ability to travel up and down on multiple levels of play.

Both Pitfall! and its sequel Pitfall II: Lost Caverns have been included as playable easter eggs in several Call of Duty titles, such as Call of Duty: Infinite Warfare, Call of Duty: Black Ops Cold War and Call of Duty: WWII.

Sequels
An Atari 2600 sequel developed by David Crane, Pitfall II: Lost Caverns, was published in 1984 as one of the last major games for the system. It was reworked into 1987's Super Pitfall for the Nintendo Entertainment System.

Pitfall: The Mayan Adventure, in the style of contemporaneous 16-bit platform games, was released for the Super Nintendo Entertainment System and Sega Genesis in 1994. It was later ported to the Sega CD in 1994, the 32X, Windows 95, and the Atari Jaguar in 1995, and the Game Boy Advance in 2001. The original Pitfall! game is included as an easter egg.

In 1998, Pitfall 3D: Beyond the Jungle was released for the PlayStation and, without the 3D designation, Game Boy Color. The game features Bruce Campbell as the voice of Pitfall Harry Jr.

In 2004, Pitfall: The Lost Expedition was released for PlayStation 2, GameCube, and Xbox. It includes both the original Pitfall! and Pitfall II games as extras. It was ported to the Wii as Pitfall: The Big Adventure in 2008.

In 2012, Activision released Pitfall! for iOS followed by a version for Android. The game is a 3D endless runner in the style of Temple Run. The same year, Crane announced a Kickstarter campaign for Jungleventure, a spiritual successor to the original games. The goal was US$900,000, but it only raised $31,207. Crane said people thought he was asking for too much money: "everyone turned against me as soon as they saw [the cost]."

In popular culture
In 1983, Pitfall! made its animated television debut as a segment on the CBS Saturday Supercade cartoon lineup, under the name Pitfall Harry. The plotline involves Harry (voiced by Robert Ridgely), his niece Rhonda (Noelle North), and his cowardly mountain lion Quickclaw (Kenneth Mars) searching for hidden treasure. After only one season, Pitfall Harry, Frogger, and Donkey Kong Jr. were replaced by Kangaroo and Space Ace.

An abbreviated version of Pitfall! is a demonstration project included with Garry Kitchen's GameMaker, published by Activision in 1985.

Pitfall! is mentioned in the movie Ready Player One as "One of the only 2600 games that still hasn't ended."

Clones
Trapfall by Ken Kalish is a direct clone for the TRS-80 Color Computer. It was licensed to Microdeal as Cuthbert in the Jungle for the Dragon 32.

References

External links
 
 Pitfall! at AtariAge
 Legends of the C64 article on David Crane and Activision (includes Pitfall! info)
 
 Pitfall map and solution
 Pitfall assembly source code

1982 video games
Activision games
Atari 2600 games
Atari 5200 games
Nintendo Entertainment System games
Atari 8-bit family games
ColecoVision games
Commodore 64 games
Intellivision games
MSX games
North America-exclusive video games
Pitfall (series)
SG-1000 games
Android (operating system) games
IOS games
Windows Mobile games
Video games designed by David Crane (programmer)
Video games set in forests
Video games developed in the United States